Punjab Kings (PBKS)  are a franchise cricket team based in Mohali, Punjab, that plays in the Indian Premier League (IPL). Established in 2008 as the Kings XI Punjab (KXIP), the franchise is jointly owned by Mohit Burman, Ness Wadia, Preity Zinta and Karan Paul. The team plays its home matches at the PCA Stadium, Mohali. Since 2010, they also have been playing some of their home games at either Dharamsala or Indore. Apart from the 2014 season when they topped the league table and finished runners-up, the team has made only one other playoff appearance in 13 seasons.

The Punjab Kings played in the now-defunct Champions League Twenty20 once, in 2014 as the Kings XI Punjab and finished as semi-finalists. The team name was changed to Punjab Kings in February 2021. In the mini auction held on 23 December 2022, Punjab Kings made the highest ever bid for a player in IPL history, paying a whopping Rs 18.50 crores for Sam Curran.

Franchise history
In 2007, the Board of Control for Cricket in India (BCCI) created the cricket tournament the Indian Premier League, based on the Twenty20 format of the game. Franchises for eight cities were made available in an auction held in Mumbai on 20 February 2008. The team representing Punjab was bought by the Dabur group's Mohit Burman (46%), the Wadia group's Ness Wadia (23%), Preity Zinta (23%), and Saptarshi Dey of the Dey & Dey Group (minor stake). The group paid a total of $76 million to acquire the franchise.

As the Kings XI Punjab, the franchise's catchment areas were the regions of Kashmir, Jammu, Himachal Pradesh, Punjab and Haryana—evident from the letter sequence "K J H P H" in the banner of the team's logo.

Expulsion from the IPL and return 
Following the controversy surrounding the BCCI and Lalit Modi in 2010, the Indian Premier League announced on 10 October 2010 that it had terminated the franchise contracts of Kings XI Punjab and the Rajasthan Royals. The teams announced that they would take legal action to remain in the Indian Premier League. Initially, the team tried to negotiate a solution with the league, but when one could not be reached, they decided to file a case in Mumbai High Court accusing the IPL of getting rid of the two teams so that when the bidding process would start for the 2012 IPL season, the contract would be given to a more lucrative bidder.

Kings XI Punjab was reinstated with the involvement of the High Court.

Name change
On 17 February 2021, Kings XI Punjab was renamed to Punjab Kings, ahead of the 2021 Indian Premier League. Ness Wadia explained the reason for changing the franchise name was to "relook at things" and rebrand after 13 seasons of IPL. He expressed his disappointment over the franchise for "not being able to win a title" and expected them to "start afresh" after a name change. He added that the name change had been planned two years ago and COVID-19 had just delayed the announcement.

Team history

2008 IPL season

The 2008 tournament got off to a slow start for the Kings XI Punjab, with the team losing their first two games. However, 94 runs by Kumar Sangakkara helped them to win the third game. Despite the absence of Brett Lee and Simon Katich (who were committed to tour the West Indies with Australia), the team found its groove. Powered by their balanced bowling line-up and effective top order, the team won nine of its next 10 matches, clinching a berth in the semi-final, where their run in the tournament came to an end with a comprehensive nine-wicket loss to the Chennai Super Kings.

Shaun Marsh was arguably KXIP's star player in the inaugural IPL. The opener from Western Australia was overlooked in the IPL player auctions and was signed by the franchise on 9 April. He finished the tournament as the Orange Cap holder—the award for the player with the most runs across the competition—with an average of 68.44 and a strike rate of 139.68 in 11 innings. Marsh managed to hit one century and five half-centuries across the course of the tournament.

2009 IPL season 

Finishing as semi-finalists in 2008, Kings XI Punjab started with ambitions to win the trophy. These were supported by their new sponsors Emirates. With two available slots to fill, the Kings XI Punjab made bids on Jerome Taylor and Yusuf Abdulla at the second IPL auction.

The team took a hit as most of their Australian cricketers were unavailable. The team lacked available pace bowlers after Jerome Taylor backed out at the last minute with an injury.

The team lost badly to the Delhi Daredevils and the Kolkata Knight Riders (KKR), however, they returned to form by beating the Royal Challengers, the Rajasthan Royals and the Mumbai Indians. Then the team witnessed a roller-coaster ride in their next eight matches with four wins and four losses. The team's semi-final hopes were crushed after losing to the Chennai Super Kings in their last match.

2010 IPL season 

Kings XI Punjab lost six matches to the Kolkata Knight Riders, the Delhi Daredevils, the Royal Challengers Bangalore, the Deccan Chargers, the Rajasthan Royals and the Mumbai Indians but managed to win a match against Chennai Super Kings when the scores were level and the match went to a Super Over. Kings XI Punjab were boosted by the return of Brett Lee against Kolkata, but he was not at his best. Shaun Marsh returned in the match against the Mumbai Indians. In spite of his good performance, which included a half century, the team lost the match. They ended the 2010 IPL in the last position.

2011 IPL season 

The 2011 IPL season looked promising when they brought a full strength team with Michael Bevan as coach and Adam Gilchrist appointed as the captain.

Kings XI Punjab missed out on the playoffs by two points (or one victory). This meant they finished fifth in the points table.

2012 IPL season 

Kings XI Punjab finished in sixth place overall, winning eight matches out of sixteen.

2013 IPL season 

Kings XI Punjab failed to qualify for the play-offs, but batsman David Miller played one of the innings of the tournament in the 51st match against the Royal Challengers Bangalore, as he smashed 101 off 38 deliveries and included eight fours and seven sixes. Coming in at no. 5 when Kings XI Punjab was struggling with only 51 runs in the scoreboard in the eighth over and chasing a target of 190, Miller rectified the game and led Punjab to a six-wicket win with two overs remaining. Adam Gilchrist retired at the end of the season.

2014 IPL season 

Australia's T20I captain George Bailey was leading the squad for the seventh season. Other buys featured the likes of Virender Sehwag, Glenn Maxwell and Mitchell Johnson. Kings XI Punjab began the tournament by winning their first five games which were held outside India in UAE due to the general elections. The stand out player was Glenn Maxwell with his unorthodox and powerful hitting, scoring 95, 89 and 95 in his first three innings with a strike rate of over 200 who got equal contribution from South African David Miller, both of them making the side look invincible. There were many innings from the veteran Indian batsman Virender Sehwag and young star Manan Vohra which made the middle order batting easy and allowed the team to qualify for the playoffs. Due to a 122 run knock from Virender Sehwag against the Chennai Super Kings in the semifinal, KXIP made their way to the final. There they faced the Kolkata Knight Riders where they batted first and set a good target of 199 owing to Wriddhiman Saha's 115. However, due to Manish Pandey's 94 off 50 balls and his teammates' consistently high strike rate, including Piyush Chawla's 13 off five balls, KKR were able to win the final by three wickets in the final over of the match.

2014 CLT20

Kings XI Punjab qualified for the 2014 Champions League Twenty20 as they finished runners-up in the 2014 IPL. They were placed in Group B along with the Hobart Hurricanes (Australia), the Barbados Tridents (West Indies), the Cape Cobras (South Africa) and the Northern Knights (New Zealand).

Kings XI's first match was in their home stadium, the PCA Stadium, Mohali where they beat Hobart Hurricanes by five wickets, overhauling Hobart's 144–6 in 17.4 overs. Thisara Perera was named the Man Of The Match with 2–17 and 35. Glenn Maxwell top scored in the game with 43. They also won the second match beating the Barbados Tridents by four wickets. They won their third match of the competition against the Northern Knights and qualified for the semi finals. They continued to win their final group match against the Cape Cobras but were knocked out of the tournament at the semi-final stage with a disappointing defeat against their IPL rivals the Chennai Super Kings, who went on to win the tournament.

2015 IPL season 

George Bailey continued to lead the side during the 2015 season. The team won just three of the 14 games and finished eighth in the league. David Miller finished the season as top scorer with 357 runs and Anureet Singh finished the season as the top wicket taker with 15 wickets.

2016 IPL season 

David Miller and Murali Vijay captained the team in the first and second half of the 2016 season respectively. The team finished eighth once again with only four wins. Murali Vijay was the top scorer with 453 runs and Sandeep Sharma was the top wicket taker with 15 wickets.

2017 IPL season 

Virender Sehwag joined as head coach as the team looked to recover from two back-to-back last-place finishes in the league. Glenn Maxwell was appointed as the captain. Eoin Morgan, Darren Sammy and Hashim Amla joined the likes of David Miller in the team. The team missed out on a place in the play-offs by a last game defeat to the Rising Pune Supergiant and ended the season in fifth, winning seven out of their 14 games. Hashim Amla finished the season as top scorer with 420 runs including two centuries, and Sandeep Sharma was the top wicket taker with 17 wickets.

2018 IPL season 

The Kings XI Punjab squad for the 2018 IPL season included internationals such as: Ravichandran Ashwin, Yuvraj Singh, KL Rahul, Aaron Finch and Chris Gayle. Ashwin was appointed as captain and Brad Hodge as coach. The Tournament started well with KL Rahul scoring a fine fifty off 14 balls to guide KXIP home against Daredevils. Riding on KL Rahul and Chris Gayle's red hot form at the top and Andrew Tye and Mujeeb Ur Rahman with the ball, the team went on to win 5 out of their first six games, eventually becoming favourites to the title. Their weakness in Indian core was however exposed as they could manage just one win in the next eight and ultimately not being qualified for the playoffs despite a dream start from the beginning.

2019 IPL season 

Franchises confirmed the names of retained players for the 12th season of Indian Premier League. KXIP retained the following players for the 2019 season: KL Rahul, Chris Gayle, Andrew Tye, Mayank Agarwal, Ankit Rajpoot, Mujeeb Ur Rahman, Karun Nair, David Miller and Ravichandran Ashwin. On the auction day (18 December 2018), KXIP snapped up new 13 players: Varun Chakaravarthy, Sam Curran, Mohammed Shami, Prabhsimran Singh, Nicholas Pooran, Moises Henriques, Hardus Viljoen, Darshan Nalkande, Sarfaraz Khan,  Arshdeep Singh, Agnivesh Ayachi, Harpreet Brar, and Murugan Ashwin. Kings XI Punjab ended up in sixth position in the league table. KL Rahul was the highest run scorer for the team with 593 runs in 14 matches.

2020 IPL season 

Kings XI Punjab released Varun Chakravarthy, Andrew Tye, Sam Curran, Prabhsimran Singh (who was rebought), David Miller, Moises Henriques and Agnivesh Ayachi from their 2020 roster. They have bought Glenn Maxwell, Deepak Hooda, James Neesham, Prabhsimran Singh, Chris Jordan, Tanjinder Dhillon, Ravi Bishnoi, Ishan Porel, Sheldon Cottrell for their 2020 squad. The retained players include KL Rahul, Karun Nair, Mohammed Shami, Nicholas Pooran, Mujeeb Ur Rahman, Chris Gayle, Mandeep Singh, Mayank Agarwal, Hardus Viljoen, Darshan Nalkande, Sarfaraz Khan, Arshdeep Singh, Harpreet Brar and Murugan Ashwin. They also transferred their former skipper R Ashwin to Delhi Capitals and Rajasthan Royals traded their all rounder Krishnappa Gowtham to Kings XI Punjab successfully.

On 20 September, the Kings XI started their season campaign. KL Rahul, the Kings' new captain, elected to field first. This thrilling match ended in a tie. Delhi started with a win in the tournament, defeating Punjab's team in the Super Over. Delhi scored 157-runs for the loss of 8 wickets in 20 overs. The team had lost early wickets, but Marcus Stoinis' brilliant innings helped the Delhi Capitals to build a 157-run target. In response to 158 runs, Punjab also scored 157-runs in 20 overs on Mayank Agarwal's knock of 89 runs.

On 24 September, Kings XI Punjab won their first match of the season defeating Royal Challengers Bangalore by 97-runs. KL Rahul lost the toss and was put to bat. Rahul and Mayank Agarwal build the Kings XI innings with a 57-run stand for the first wicket. Rahul scored 132 off 69 balls with 14 fours and 7 sixes and helped the Kings XI finish the innings at 206/3 in 20 overs. Chasing a target of 207, the Royal Challengers had lost three wickets in a first four overs. Kings XI's new ball pair of Sheldon Cottrell and Mohammed Shami continued their good work from the first match and Royal Challengers were eventually bowled out for 109. Rahul became the fastest Indian batsman to complete 2000 runs in IPL. However, they were ousted against Rajasthan Royals who successfully chased down 223 and then continued to lose five matches. The losing streak was broken when Punjab defeated Bangalore for second time and then defeated Mumbai Indians in the Super Over and continued to win three more matches against Delhi, Hyderabad and Kolkata. However, they lost two matches at the end of the tournament. Their last match was against Chennai Super Kings who won comprehensively by 9 wickets, therefore knocking Punjab out of the tournament. They finished the season at the sixth place. KL Rahul was again the highest scorer for the team with 670 runs, while Mohammed Shami topped the bowling charts for the franchise, with 20 wickets from 14 matches.

2021 IPL season

2022 IPL season

2023 IPL season

Seasons

Indian Premier League

Current squad 
 Players with international caps are listed in bold.

Administration and support staff

Sponsors and partners

Statistics

Performance summary

 Last updated: 4 April 2022

Opposition in Indian Premier League

 Last updated: 6 April 2022
Full Table on Cricinfo

Opposition in CLT20

See also
 List of Punjab Kings cricketers

References

External links

Indian Premier League teams
Sports clubs in Punjab, India
Cricket clubs established in 2008
Wadia Group
2008 establishments in Punjab, India
Dabur Group